Tyler Johnstone (born September 29, 1992) is a professional Canadian football offensive lineman who is a free agent. He most recently played for the Montreal Alouettes of the Canadian Football League (CFL). He played college football for the Oregon Ducks.

Professional career

San Diego Chargers
After going undrafted in the 2016 NFL Draft, Johnstone signed as a free agent with the San Diego Chargers of the National Football League on April 30, 2016. He spent the season on the injured reserve and was released in April 2017.

Montreal Alouettes
After obtaining dual Canadian-U.S. citizenship, Johnstone was drafted by the Alouettes on July 2, 2018 in the 2018 Supplemental CFL Draft, meaning that the Alouettes forfeited a first-round selection in the 2019 CFL Draft to obtain his playing rights. He signed with the Alouettes on July 17, 2018. He played and started in his first game on July 21, 2018, his only game played in 2018. He became a free agent upon the expiry of his contract on February 9, 2021.

References

External links
Montreal Alouettes bio 

1985 births
Canadian football offensive linemen
Oregon Ducks football players
Living people
Montreal Alouettes players
Sportspeople from Chandler, Arizona
American football offensive linemen
Canadian players of American football
San Diego Chargers players